The 2016 Carlisle City Council election took place on 5 May 2016 to elect members of Carlisle City Council in England. This was on the same day as other local elections.

By-elections between 2016 and 2018

Castle (15 September 2016)

Castle (24 November 2016)

Belle Vue (4 May 2017)

Yewdale (4 May 2017)

References

2016 English local elections
2016
2010s in Cumbria